Aleksandar "Aca" Obradović (Serbian Cyrillic: Александар Аца Обрадовић), also known as Dr Aca Obradović, or simply "Doktor O" (born 1922 in Mionica, Kingdom of Serbs, Croats and Slovenes - died 22 June 2000 in Belgrade, Federal Republic of Yugoslavia) was a Yugoslavian/Serbian football administrator, most notable as a technical director of Red Star Belgrade.

War years
Born into a family of four-generation innkeepers in Mionica near Valjevo, he joined and spent two years with the Chetnik movement during World War II, was imprisoned in Banjica concentration camp but managed to escape.  The next two years he spent in Vienna but returned to the Chetnik movement in 1944.

Red Star Belgrade
Obradović obtained a university degree, and became an Assistant professor at the Belgrade Medical School. He has joined newly-formed Red Star Belgrade as a physiotherapist. When he had a choice whether to pursue an academic career and become an Associate professor in faculty or a football club administrator, he made the decision to stay in football. He was a member of long listed management structures where he became legendary for uncommon methods of directing a club. Also, he played the same role in the Yugoslavian national team. He was involved in almost all "big" transfers for the club at the time, and also generated the idea for building a "Marakana" - Red Star Belgrade Stadium.
His cult status in the club is strongly linked with "Kafana Madera" (in Serbian: a "Madera Tavern") the place where the vast number of football and non football agreements are made. During his era, "Madera" became the epicenter of events in football and society.

Move to the US
In 1966 after Obradović was expelled from his favorite club by the Communist Committee of Belgrade, he moved to the United States and formed a football/soccer club—the San Francisco Clippers—thus becoming one of the pioneers of soccer in the US. His sense of business came to the fore during the Prague Spring in 1968, when Soviet forces entered the Czechoslovakian capital. At the time, it happened that the best Czechoslovakian team Dukla Praha and the Soviet Union team were guests in the US so Obradović formed a four-team tournament with participants: Dukla, Soviet Union, San Francisco Clippers and Mexico (as a host of soon to be Olympics). For that, he made a television broadcasting contract with the NBC worth two million dollars, with the condition that a Soviet and a Czechoslovak team would play in the finals. Unfortunately, that plan failed—just before the final match the Soviet embassy prohibited their team from playing.

In his career, Obradović was also NK Olimpija Ljubljana and Valencia C.F. administrator. In 1982 he obtained an official FIFA managerial license, thus becoming the first licensed manager in Yugoslavia.

Death
Doctor Obradović died on 22 June 2000 in Belgrade aged 78.

References

External links
Svedok magazine article 
Glas javnosti magazine on his death 
Biography in Vreme magazine,  

1922 births
Red Star Belgrade non-playing staff
CD Castellón managers
2000 deaths
People from Mionica
Yugoslav people